Common eyebright is a common name for several plants in the genus Euphrasia and may refer to:

Euphrasia nemorosa
Euphrasia rostkoviana